The Defence Establishment Orchard Hills (abbreviated as DEOH) is a tri-service munitions storage base of particular importance to the Royal Australian Air Force (RAAF). The base is also home to the RAAF-run Defence Explosive Ordnance Training School, which provides training in handling explosives to all branches of the Australian Defence Force.

As well as the storage of munitions, other activities carried out on the  site include the use of weapon ranges, firing ranges, fire training areas, and fuel storage and distribution from above ground and underground storage tanks. The site also contains a sewerage treatment plant, and two landfills for waste disposal from both site operations and general non-putrescible refuse, including building rubble.

Also located on site is the privately owned Thales Ordnance Training Centre, an accredited Registered Training Organisation that provides qualifications specific to explosives, and covering the disciplines of storage, transport, manufacture and proofing of explosive ordnance.

See also

List of Royal Australian Air Force installations

References 

Australian Defence Force bases
Royal Australian Air Force bases
Military installations in New South Wales
1940s establishments in Australia
Military installations established in the 1940s